Alica Székelyová (born 5 January 1981) was a Slovak female volleyball player, playing as a setter. She was part of the Slovakia women's national volleyball team.

She competed at the 2006 FIVB Volleyball Women's World Championship qualifications, and 2007 Women's European Volleyball Championship. 
On club level she played for Diego Porcelos in 2007.

References

External links
 
 
 

1981 births
Living people
Slovak women's volleyball players
Slovak expatriate sportspeople in Spain
Place of birth missing (living people)